Coremacera is a genus of flies in the family Sciomyzidae, the marsh flies or snail-killing flies.

Species
C. amoena (Loew, 1835)
C. catenata (Loew, 1847)
C. confluens Rondani, 1868
C. fabricii Rozkošný, 1981
C. halensis (Loew, 1864)
C. marginata (Fabricius, 1775)
C. obscuripennis (Loew, 1845)
C. scutellata (Matsumura, 1916)
C. turkestanica (Elberg, 1968)
C. ussuriensis (Elberg, 1968)

References

 L. Watson and M. J. Dallwitz. Sciomyzidae .
  Taxonomy And Geographic Distribution Of Species Of The Genus Coremacera Palearctic Sciomyzidae Diptera. 
 Biolib

Sciomyzidae
Sciomyzoidea genera
Taxa named by Camillo Rondani